Events of 2021 in Honduras.

Incumbents
President: Juan Orlando Hernández
President of the National Congress: Mauricio Oliva

Events

January to June
January 2 – A Honduran national identified as Leidy Hernández, 24, gives birth while crossing the bridge between Matamoros, Tamaulipas and Brownsville, Texas. The baby will be entitled to Mexican citizenship.
January 9 – Prosecutors in the United States District Court for the Southern District of New York accuse former President Juan Orlando Hernández of taking bribes and protecting drug traffickers.
January 13 – Two hundred migrants march towards San Pedro Sula en route to Guatemala, where they are expected to meet 2,000 police and military units.
January 21 – The National Congress of Honduras outlaws abortion in all forms.
February 11 – Dozens protest the death of nursing student Keyla Patricia Martínez, who died while in police custody, insisting her death be investigated as homicide.
February 8 – An eight-year old Honduran boy drowns while trying to cross the Rio Grande (Río Bravo del Norte) near Piedras Negras, Coahuila. His parents identified the body after being arrested by U.S. immigration agents.
February 23 – U.S.Senator Jeff Merkley (D-OR) introduces legislation to restrict security aid to Honduras and to investigate President Orlando Hernández for corruption and ties to drug traffickers.
February 24 – Orlando Hernández warns that U.S.—Honduran cooperation on drug trafficking could collapse if members of Los Cachiros cartel are allowed to give ″false testimony″ against him in U.S. courts.
March 8 – The trial of Geovanny Fuentes Ramirez, 50, on cocaine, weapons, and bribery charges begins in New York.
March 9 – New York prosecutors say Honduras is a ″narco-state″ and that Geovanny Fuentes Ramirez reported “directly to Tony Hernández,” the president’s brother.
March 19 – Father's Day and Saint Joseph′s Day.
March 28–April 3 — Holy Week
March 30
Tony Hernández is found guilty of state-sponsored drug trafficking and fined USD $138 million.
Hundreds of migrants who lack proper identification papers and proof of negative COVID-19 tests are turned back by police at Corinto, Honduras.

July to December

 September 15 – Independence Day, 206th anniversary of the Act of Independence of Central America.

October 2 - 2021 Guanaja fire
October 3 – Francisco Morazán Day, honors the 2nd president of the Federal Republic of Central America (1835–1839).

Sports
2020–21 Honduran Liga Nacional

Deaths
February 6 – Keyla Patricia Martínez, 26 or 28, nursing student in La Esperanza, Intibucá Department; murder by choking while in police custody.
February 12 – Celso Güity, 63, footballer (Marathón, Sula, national team); cancer.
March 22 – Juan Carlos Cerros Escalante, 41, indegnous environmental activist (Lenca); shot
April 25 - Pablo José Cámbar, 78, academic, COVID-19
April 28 - Chelato Uclés, 80, footballer
July 28 - Porfirio Armando Betancourt, 63, footballer
October 1 - Nora Gúnera de Melgar, 78, politician, first lady

See also

2021 in Central America
COVID-19 pandemic in Honduras
2021 Atlantic hurricane season
Public holidays in Honduras

References

External links

 
2020s in Honduras
Honduras
Honduras
Years of the 21st century in Honduras